Ashlyn Michelle Harris (born October 19, 1985) is an American former soccer player.

She represented the United States women's national soccer team, making her debut for the senior national team on March 11, 2013, and was a member of the championship–winning team at the 2015 FIFA Women's World Cup in Canada and at the 2019 FIFA Women's World Cup in France.

Harris played college soccer for the University of North Carolina Tar Heels and helped the team win three NCAA Division I Women's Soccer Championships. Professionally, Harris played for the Saint Louis Athletica, Washington Freedom, and Western New York Flash of Women's Professional Soccer as well as FCR 2001 Duisburg of Frauen-Bundesliga in Germany and Tyresö FF of the Swedish Damallsvenskan. She also played for Washington Spirit, Orlando Pride, and Gotham FC of the National Women's Soccer League (NWSL).

Early life
Born to Tammye and Mike Harris in Cocoa Beach, Florida, Ashlyn was raised with her older brother, Chris. Growing up, she looked up to her brother and frequently joined him and his friends skateboarding and surfing. Until the age of 14, she played club soccer with the boys' teams. She first played for the Palm Bay Rangers and South Brevard United before playing for the Seminole Ice girls team. In 2003, Harris won the state championship with the U-17 Indialantic Force.

Harris attended Satellite High School in Satellite Beach, where she played soccer under coach Fitzgerald Haig. Harris helped the team win state championship titles her sophomore and junior year in 2002 and 2003. Following her senior season, Harris was named the nation's number one recruit by Soccer America. She was then named 2004 Gatorade Player of the Year and 2004 NSCAA Player of the Year. At the end of her high school career, Harris was a four-time Parade Magazine All-American, a four-time NSCAA Youth All-American, and a McDonald's All-American. She was the first female to be named to four consecutive Parade All-American soccer teams. She was named Florida Player of the Year for her last two years at Satellite High School. Harris also made All-Conference, All-District, and All-States teams for all fours years. In her 65 career games at Satellite High School, she recorded 50 shutouts and had 0.29 goals against average. She graduated in May 2004 with a 3.8 GPA.

North Carolina Tar Heels, 2006–09
Harris signed with the University of North Carolina Tar Heels to play for head coach Anson Dorrance. Due to national team commitments for the FIFA U-19 Women's World Cup in Thailand in the fall of 2004, Harris delayed her enrollment and did not start training with the Tar Heels until the spring of 2005. During one spring practice, a ball caught her right hand as she was warming up and shattered her thumb. After a surgery that inserted three pins in her thumb, she was put on the bench until the summer. At her first practice back with the Tar Heels in the summer of 2005, Harris tore her right anterior cruciate ligament, which kept her out for the entire 2005 season. Despite being hurt, Harris still made the 2006 Atlantic Coast Conference Academic Honor Roll team.
After recovering from her ACL injury, Harris returned to practice with the Tar Heels in the spring of 2006. However, she then tore her left ACL during a training camp with the U-21 Women's National Team in June 2006. She was able to make it back in time for the 2006 NCAA Women's Soccer Tournament in November, although she came in as a substitute in every game, a strategy employed by Dorrance. She played in all six NCAA Tournament matches, including the championship game against Notre Dame, a 2–1 win for UNC. Harris was named to the 2007 ACC Academic Honor Roll at the end of her sophomore year.

During the 2007 season, Harris was diagnosed with a torn labrum in her right hip which occurred during a goal kick. Harris did not miss any games following the injury and instead switched to mainly using her left leg and dealt with the pain. Dorrance again employed the two-goalkeeper method, as Harris split time with junior goalkeeper, Anna Rodenbough. The two goalkeepers alternated starts and played for half of each game. Harris played in 19 games and made 9 starts, playing a total of 1120 minutes. She allowed nine goals and recorded 29 saves, giving a 0.763 save percentage. UNC lost their match against Notre Dame in the third round of the 2007 NCAA Women's Soccer Tournament on November 24, 2007.

The 2008 season was the first season where Harris was healthy for the entire season. Dorrance again employed Harris in the two-goalkeeper system along with Rodenbough. Harris played in 27 games and made 13 starts, playing a total of 1233 minutes. She allowed nine goals and recorded 28 saves, giving a 0.757 save percentage. In the 2008 NCAA Women's Soccer Tournament, Harris appeared in second half of the third round match against Illinois, where she made three saves, as well as the semi-final match against UCLA, where she again made three saves. She appeared in goal in the championship game against Notre Dame, which UNC won 2–1.

Harris returned for the 2009 season, the first season in which she did not share the position with another goalkeeper. She started all 25 of her appearances for the team, playing a total of 2163 minutes in goal. She allowed 10 goals in 25 games, recording 45 saves for a 0.818 save percentage and 0.42 goals against average. UNC went on to win the 2009 NCAA Women's Soccer Tournament after a 1–0 win over Stanford in the championship game.

College summary

Club career

Pali Blues, 2009 
On April 16, 2009, Harris and UNC teammate Whitney Engen signed with the Pali Blues of the W-League. The W-League was often used by college players as a summer playing option because of its status as an open league, allowing college players to maintain eligibility. Harris made five appearances with the team for the 2009 season during the summer before her senior year at UNC. The Pali Blues went undefeated in the regular season and then went on to win the W-League Championship with a 2–1 win over Washington Freedom in the final.

Saint Louis Athletica, 2010

Harris was selected with the 19th pick in the 2010 WPS Draft by Saint Louis Athletica of Women's Professional Soccer on January 15, 2010. During her time with Athletica, Harris trained alongside United States women's national team starting goalkeeper Hope Solo. The goalkeeper coach for the national team, Paul Rogers, was also on the staff for Athletica, providing another benefit for Harris. Regarding her situation with Athletica, Harris stated that she "was probably in the best situation possible as a rookie goalkeeper." On May 27, 2010, six weeks into the second season of Women's Professional Soccer, Saint Louis Athletica ceased operations due to financial problems. Harris did not appear in any of the six games for Saint Louis before the dissolution. Harris, as well as all others on the Athletica roster, became free agents on June 1.

Washington Freedom, 2010
On June 2, 2010, Harris signed with the Washington Freedom following the dissolution of Saint Louis Athletica. After signing with the Freedom, Harris stated that her contributions to the team would not be through starting and playing, as Erin McLeod was the starting goalkeeper for the team at the time. On July 24, McLeod suffered an ACL tear during a match against FC Gold Pride. Briana Scurry, the back-up for the Freedom, had suffered a concussion earlier in the year and was also out for the season. Harris was left as the starting goalkeeper and made her first appearance for the team on July 28, 2010, where she started in a match against Atlanta Beat. She appeared in the seven remaining games of the regular season and earned the Freedom a spot in the playoffs. The Freedom took on the Philadelphia Independence in the first round of the playoffs on September 19. Harris made three saves in regular time and the match was scoreless after 90 minutes. In the 120th minute, Amy Rodriguez scored for Philadelphia, resulting in a 1–0 victory and the Freedom's elimination from the playoffs.

Western New York Flash, 2011
In December 2010, the Western New York Flash, previously part of the W-League, joined the WPS for the 2011 season. Shortly after, the Flash announced they had signed Harris. She appeared in the team's debut in the league on April 17, 2011, against the Boston Breakers. She made eighteen appearances for the Flash in the regular season, allowing eighteen goals and helping the Flash rank number one at the end of the season. Harris made the start in the 2011 WPS Championship on August 27, 2011, against the Philadelphia Independence. The game was tied 1–1 after regulation and extra time, leaving the outcome of the match to be decided by penalty kicks. Both the Independence and the Flash made their first four shots. However, Harris blocked the shot by Philadelphia's Laura del Rio, clinching the championship for the Flash. She was named the 2011 Coast Guard Goalkeeper of the Year following a successful 2011 season.

FCR 2001 Duisburg, 2012
On January 30, 2012, it was announced that the 2012 WPS season would be suspended following legal and financial challenges. Although the league was intended to resume for the 2013 season, it officially folded in May. In June, Harris signed a two-year contract with FCR 2001 Duisburg in the Frauen-Bundesliga, the top professional women's league in Germany. She made her first appearance for the team on October 3, 2012, where she recorded a shut out against VfL Sindelfingen. She made eight appearances for Duisburg, appearing for a total of 630 minutes.

Washington Spirit, 2013
On January 11, 2013, Harris was allocated to the Washington Spirit during the 2013 NWSL Player Allocation for the inaugural season of the National Women's Soccer League. On February 23, following the allocation, Harris announced that she would be leaving her previous club, FCR 2001 Duisburg, and returning home in order to play in the newly formed NWSL. She started in the Spirit's first match on April 14 against the Boston Breakers. In her 18 appearances for the Spirit in 2013, she made 84 saves and ended the season with a 72% save percentage. The Spirit finished in last place in the league and did not advance to the playoffs.

Tyresö FF, 2013
In July 2013, during the first NWSL season, it was announced that Harris would be joining the Swedish club Tyresö FF immediately following the NWSL regular season in late August. Harris, Spirit teammate Ali Krieger, and former UNC teammate Whitney Engen all signed short-term contracts with the team. They joined United States national team members Christen Press and Meghan Klingenberg, who were already with the club on long-term contracts. Four days after the end of the NWSL season, Harris played her first game for Tyresö on August 21, 2013. She made seven appearances with the team in the Damallsvenskan regular season and four appearances in the UEFA Women's Champions League.

In December, following the announcement that Engen, Press, and Klingenberg would be staying with Tyresö until the end of the Champions League, Harris announced that she was leaving Sweden in order to return to the Washington Spirit for the 2014 season.

Washington Spirit, 2014–15 
On January 3, 2014, Harris was once again allocated to the Washington Spirit for the 2014 season. Harris started all 19 of her appearances for the Spirit in the 2014 season, allowing 31 goals in 1710 minutes.

On July 2, the Washington Spirit faced the Boston Breakers. In the 88th minute, Spirit defender Ali Krieger was issued a yellow card. Harris confronted Boston Breakers forward Jazmine Reeves and referee Dimitar N. Chavdarov stepped in to end to altercation. Harris then appeared to push Chavdarov. The Professional Referee Organization reviewed the incident and found that the contact was minimal. An NWSL spokesman released the following statement regarding the incident:

In a match against the Chicago Red Stars on August 2, Harris sustained a concussion and missed two games. She was officially cleared to play on August 20 and appeared in the Spirit's semifinal game against the Seattle Reign on August 25. The Spirit lost the match 2–1, eliminating them from the playoffs.

In 2015, Harris missed almost half of the NWSL season due to commitments with the United States women's national team at the FIFA Women's World Cup in Canada. She returned to the Spirit in late-July, appearing in a match against the Chicago Red Stars on July 25, which ended in a 1–1 draw. Harris made nine appearances for the Spirit in the regular season, allowing 12 goals and recording a save percentage of 78%.

The Spirit ended the season in fourth place, clinching a spot in the playoffs. They faced Seattle Reign in the semifinals on September 13. Harris allowed three goals during the match for a 3–0 win for the Reign, eliminating the Spirit from the playoffs.

Orlando Pride, 2016–2021
On October 20, 2015, the Orlando Pride officially became the tenth team in the National Women's Soccer League. Shortly after, the Washington Spirit announced that they would be leaving Harris unprotected for the 2015 Expansion Draft, giving the Orlando Pride the opportunity to select Harris for their roster for the 2016 season. On November 2, the Pride selected Harris with their second pick in the 2015 Expansion Draft.

Harris made her first appearance for the Pride on April 17 in a match against the Portland Thorns, losing to the Thorns 2–1. Harris was named NWSL Goalkeeper of the Year in 2016, she made 62 saves and had a 1.33 goals-against-average in 15 games. She was also named to the 2016 NWSL Best XI.

In 2017 Harris only appeared in 14 games for Orlando, as she suffered a quad injury that forced her to miss 8 weeks. Orlando finished 3rd in the regular season standings, and qualified for the playoffs. They lost 4–1 to Portland in the semifinal.

Harris played 21 games in the 2018 season. She had 4 clean sheets, and recorded 70 saves. Orlando could not duplicate their 2017 success, and finished in a disappointing 7th place.

Harris started the 2019 season positively by winning the NWSL Save of the Week. and ended the season on 9th place.

During the 2021 NWSL Challenge Cup, Harris saved penalties in back to back games against Gotham FC and Washington Spirit. She registered nine saves in total during the 1–0 win over Washington, only one fewer than the club's single-match save record she set in April 2017, to help the Pride's to their first victory in 609 days. On August 29, 2021, Harris set a new NWSL all-time career save record with her 469th save during a 1–0 win over Gotham FC. The previous record was held by Nicole Barnhart.

NJ/NY Gotham FC, 2022
On December 6, 2021, Harris was traded alongside Ali Krieger to Gotham FC in exchange for a first-round pick in the 2022 NWSL Draft, a third-round pick in the 2023 NWSL Draft and $50,000 in allocation money.

On November 14, 2022, Harris announced her professional retirement from soccer at the Player's Ball in New York City.

International career

Youth national teams, 2000–06 
In 1999, Harris attended the United States U-14 Girl's National Team Identification Camp. She represented the United States as a member of the U-16, U-17, and U-19 teams in 2000.

Under-19 women's national team 
Harris made 11 appearances for the U-19 team in 2001, she started nine of those matches recording four shutouts. Of the 11 appearances, two of them were international matches. Harris started off 2001 with the U-19 team during a WUSA preseason exhibition match on March 25 against the Boston Breakers in Chula Vista, California. She allowed one goal during the match for a 1–0 victory for the Breakers. Harris then made appearances in two matches against the Canadian U-19 national team on June 30 and July 2. Harris joined the U-19 national team for an eight-day training camp in December 2001 at the U.S. Olympic Training Center in San Diego, California.

Harris started off 2002 with the U-19 national team at the ARCO Olympic Training Center in Chula Vista, California in late January for a training camp. In early March, Harris was a member of the roster for a two-game tour of Mexico, where she appeared in two games against Costa Rica and Mexico in Pachuca, Mexico. She recorded a shutout in the 4–0 victory over Costa Rica and allowed one goal against Mexico, giving a 2–1 win to the United States. From March 17 to 23, Harris and the U-19 team joined the San Jose CyberRays, San Diego Spirit, the United States U-21 national team, and the United States National Amateur team for the WUSA pre-season tournament. Harris also appeared in the two warmup games before the CONCACAF qualifying tournament.

On April 18, 2002, United States U-19 national team head coach Tracey Leone named Harris to the 18-player roster for the CONCACAF qualifying tournament. The tournament was held from May 7 to 11 and served as a qualification for the inaugural FIFA U-19 Women's World Championship. The round-robin tournament featured games against Surinam, Haiti, and Costa Rica. Harris started in all three matches, recording shutouts against Suriname and Haiti, while allowing one goal for Costa Rica. The United States won their group and qualified for the U-19 Women's World Championship.

Following the CONCACAF tournament, Harris joined the U-19 team on a 15-day tour of Europe in June that included matches against Germany's U-19 and U-21 teams, Sweden's U-19 team, German Bundesliga team Duisburg, and Swedish Damallsvenskan team Hammarby FC. In July, Harris was named to the 27-player roster for a 13-day training camp at the U.S. Olympic Training Center in San Diego. Following the training camp, Harris was subsequently named to the U-19 team that would represent the United States at the 2002 FIFA U-19 Women's World Championship in late August.

At the age of 16, Harris was the youngest member on the United States team at the U-19 Women's World Championship. The tournament was held in Canada from August 17 to September 1. Harris started in all six matches for the United States during the tournament. In the group stage, she allowed one goal during the opening match against England on August 17. She then recorded two shut outs against Australia and Chinese Taipei on August 19 and 21, respectively. The United States faced Denmark in the quarterfinals on August 25, where Harris once again posted a shut out. She allowed one goal for Germany in the semifinals on August 29. During the championship game of the tournament, the United States faced Canada. Harris posted another shut out for a 1–0 victory in overtime for the United States. Harris made eight total shutouts in 15 appearances for the U-19 team in 2002.

Harris trained with the U-19 national team at the ARCO U.S. Olympic Training Center in January 2003 to start off the year. In February, Harris was on the roster for a two-game series with the full Mexican women's national team. She then joined the team once again for a nine-day training camp at the ARCO Olympic Training Center in April. While there, the team played a match against the San Diego Spirit.

Harris was briefly called up to the U-21 national team for a 13-day training camp and four-game tour of Brazil in May. Two of the games were against Brazil's U-21 team and the two others were against Santos FC and Saad FC. Harris was one of the two players on the roster that were not yet in college. Following the training camp, Harris moved back down to the U-19 team, where she was a member of the roster for the USYS Cup in late May. Harris started in goal during the first match of the tournament against Canada on May 27 in a 6–1 win. After her appearance in the tournament, Harris once again joined the U-21 team. On July 9, she was named to the 18-player team that would represent the United States at the Nordic Cup in Denmark. She started the team's first match against Denmark on July 21 and recorded a shut out for a 1–0 victory for the United States. She also appeared in the final game of the tournament on July 27 against Sweden. She allowed one goal during the match and the United States won 2–1, taking the Nordic Cup.

In October 2003, Harris joined the U-19 women's national team for a training camp at the Home Depot Center in Carson, California. The team also played matches against local club teams during the training camp. The team gathered one last time for the year for a training camp from December 27 to January 2 at the U.S. Soccer's National Training Center at The Home Depot Center in Carson, California. Harris was on the 26-player roster for the training camp. Shortly after, Harris joined the team for another training camp from January 23 to February first at The Home Depot Center.

Harris was named to the 18-player roster for a two-game series against the full Mexican women's national team on February 18 and 20. Having 23 caps with the U-19 team at that point, Harris was the most experienced player on the roster.

Harris was a member of the U-19 national team that played in the Philips Lighting U-19 Women's Soccer Invitational, their first major domestic tournament, from April 6 to 10. In the first match of the tournament against Holland on April 6, Harris recorded a shut out for a 2–0 for the United States. She made her second appearance in the tournament during the team's final match against China on April 10. She recorded another shutout for a 4–0 win, giving the United States a second-place finish in the invitational.

On April 28, Harris was named to the 18-player roster that would represent the United States at the CONCACAF U-19 Women's Qualifying Tournament held in Ottawa and Montreal, Canada. Harris was one of four members of the team that were also on the team that won the inaugural FIFA U-19 World Championship in 2002. She was also the most capped U-19 player on the roster. Harris recorded a shut out against Dominican Republic on May 28 for a 14–0 win. She then started in goal against Trinidad & Tobago on May 30. The lone goal for Trinidad & Tobago came during the 86th minute, after Kelsey Davis came on for Harris in the 62nd minute. The United States won the match 11–1, guaranteeing their spot in the semifinals. Harris recorded her second shut out of the tournament on June 1 during the team's final group match against Costa Rica, which ended in a 0–0 draw. In the semifinal match against Mexico on June 4, Harris recorded another shut out. The 6–0 win secured the United States U-19 women's national team a place in the 2004 FIFA U-19 Women's World Championship, although they still had one more match in the tournament. Harris started in the final against Canada on June 6. She made seven saves during the game and allowed two goals. Canada won the match in overtime.

Harris trained with the U-19 national team during their first training camp following the CONCACAF Qualifying Tournament. The training took place in from July 7 to 18 in New Jersey. Leading up to the FIFA U-19 Women's World Championship held in November, Harris joined the U-19 team for another training at the U.S. Soccer's National Training Center at The Home Depot Center in Carson, California in late August.

Harris delayed her enrollment at the University of North Carolina at Chapel Hill in order to train with the U-19 team leading up to the U-19 World Championship in a modified residency program. In the two months leading up to the championship, the team trained together in two-week blocks until they left for the tournament in November.

On October 12, Harris was named to the 21-player roster that would represent the United States at the 2004 FIFA Women's World Championship in Thailand. Harris was captain of the team and played every minute in all six matches of the tournament for the United States. Harris started in net in the opening group match against South Korea on November 11 and recorded a shut out for a 3–0 win. She allowed one goal during the match against Russia on November 14 in a 4–1 win for the United States. She recorded her second shut out of the tournament on November 18 against Spain in the team's final group match. The United States won 1–0 and was the only team to win all three of its group matches. In the quarterfinals, Harris posted her third shut out in the 2–0 win over Australia on November 21. The United States moved into the semifinals, where they faced Germany on November 24. Harris started in the net and allowed three goals during the match. The Germans took the win and halted the United States' advancement in the tournament. The United States faced Brazil in the third place match, where Harris played all 90 minutes. She made eight saves and recorded her fourth shut out of the tournament. The United States won the game 3–0 and took away third place. Harris was subsequently named to the Tournament All-Star Team by the FIFA Technical Study Group. She was also a 2004 Chevrolet Athlete of the Year Award Finalist.

Harris finished her U-19 career with 39 caps, the most of any United States player.

Under-21 women's national team 
Harris was called up to a U-21 national team training camp held from March 26 to April 3 at the U.S. Soccer National Team Training Center in Carson California. Harris then sustained an ACL injury in the summer of 2005, which kept her off the field until 2006. She returned to the U-21 national team in 2006 for a training camp from June 11 to 17 in Maryland. It was during this training camp that Harris sustained her second ACL injury, this time to her left knee.

Senior national team, 2009–present 
Harris received her first call-up to the senior national team for a 12-day training camp held from September 21 to October 2, 2009. It was her first national team training camp since June 2006, when she trained with the U-21 before tearing her ACL. Of her first few days at camp, Harris stated: 

On September 7, 2010, United States women's national team head coach Pia Sundhage named a 30-player roster for two matches against China in October. The roster would then be narrowed down to the 20-player roster for the 2010 CONCACAF Women's World Cup Qualifying tournament. The players would take part in a training camp before the two matches starting on September 20. Although Harris was not one of the four goalkeepers on this preliminary roster, she was called into camp on September 23 to replace Hope Solo, who was recovering from a shoulder surgery. She was then named to the 24-player roster for the team's second match against China on October 6 in Philadelphia, although she did not dress for the match. She was not named to the 20-player roster for the 2010 CONCACAF Women's World Cup Qualifying tournament, but she did travel with the team to train.

Harris was named to a 24-player preliminary roster for a two-game series in November 2010. Harris was then called into a six-day training camp in January 2011 in Carson, California leading up to the 2011 Four Nations Tournament. Because Solo was still out with a shoulder injury and Jill Loyden was out with a broken hand, Harris was named to the roster for the tournament to back-up Nicole Barnhart.

Harris joined the national team for another training camp in Ft. Lauderdale, Florida from February 3 to 9. Following the camp, she was named to the 24-player roster for the 2011 Algarve Cup. She was subsequently named to the roster of 20 players that suited up for the games, although she did not make an appearance. She was on the roster for a match against England on April 2 in East London. In late April, Harris trained with the national team for three weeks in final preparations for the 2011 Women's World Cup. Although she did not make the final roster for the World Cup, she joined the team following the tournament in November for a two-week training camp in Arizona. She also trained with the team in December and January. Following the 2012 CONCACAF Olympic Qualifying Tournament, Harris joined a 28-player roster for a training camp in Frisco, Texas in the week leading up to a match against New Zealand on February 11, although she did not suit up for the game.

On February 17, Harris was named to a 23-player roster for the 2012 Algarve Cup. While in Portugal, Harris played in a closed-door training match against China on February 25, splitting halves with Nicole Barnhart. Harris was not named to the roster of 21 players that suited up for the games in the tournament. Harris traveled with the national team in early April to compete at the Women's Kirin Challenge Cup in Japan. Following the tournament, she trained with the national team in Florida from April 18 to 30. During the training camp, Harris injured her left shoulder, sustaining a small tear in her labrum. She still went on to train with the national team in New Jersey from May 10 to 25. However, in early June, she decided to undergo surgery to repair the tear in order to prevent further damage. The surgery kept her off the pitch for the rest of 2012.

In January 2013, Harris was called up to a 29-player training camp leading up to two matches in early February. This was her first time back with the national team following her shoulder surgery the previous June. Following the training camp and matches, Harris was named to the 23-player roster for the 2013 Algarve Cup in Portugal. The team's starting goalkeeper Hope Solo was out with a wrist injury, giving Harris the opportunity to make an appearance in the tournament. She was the only uncapped player on the roster.

On March 11, 2013, Harris earned her first appearance with the senior team in a match against Sweden. Harris played all 90 minutes of the match and allowed one goal for a 1–1 draw. Following the match, head coach Tom Sermanni stated the following regarding Harris's performance:

Harris stated that she had "waited a long time for [that] moment" and although she was nervous, she was happy with her performance.

Harris traveled to Europe with the national team for matches against Germany and the Netherlands in early April. Harris made her second appearance for the national team on April 9 against the Netherlands. She allowed one goal during the match for a 3–1 win for the United States. In late May, Harris was named to the 21-player roster that traveled to Canada to train before facing Canada on June 2. She did not suit up for the match.

On December 3, Harris underwent arthroscopic surgery to repair a torn lateral meniscus in her left knee. The injury had affected her play since June and kept her out for a month following the surgery.

Harris returned to the national team in 2014 for a training camp from January 8 to 15 at U.S. Soccer's National Training Center in Carson, California. Harris was not named to the roster for the 2014 Algarve Cup. In late April, Harris was named to a 22-player roster for a match against Canada on May 8, although she did not dress for the game. She was on the roster for two games in June against France. On June 19, 2014, Harris made her third appearance for the national team in their second game against France in East Hartford, Connecticut. She started and played all 90 minutes, allowing two goals for a 2–2 draw.

Harris was named to a 19-player roster for a match against Switzerland on August 20 in Sandy, Utah. Shortly after, she was replaced on the roster by Alyssa Naeher after she suffered a concussion with the Washington Spirit. She returned to the national team for a training camp at the end of August in order to prepare for two matches against Mexico in September as well as the 2014 CONCACAF Women's Championship in October. She dressed for both games against Mexico and was subsequently named to the roster for the 2014 CONCACAF Women's Championship that served as a qualification for the 2015 FIFA Women's World Cup. This was the first CONCACAF qualifying roster that Harris made at the senior level. She made her fourth appearance for the national team in team's final group match against Haiti on October 20, 2014 in Washington, D.C. She played all 90 minutes and recorded her first career shut out in a 6–0 win for the United States. The United States went on to win the tournament after a 6–0 win over Costa Rica. Harris was named to the 24-player roster for the International Tournament of Brasilia in Brazil from December 10 to 21. While in Brazil, Harris sustained a broken pinky finger and underwent surgery in order to repair it. She recovered in time to fully participate in a 21-day training camp in 2015 from January 5 to 25 at the U.S. Soccer National Training Center in Carson, California.

Harris traveled with the team on a 13-day trip to Europe for matches against France and England in mid-February. United States starting goalkeeper Hope Solo was out on suspension during the matches, giving Harris the opportunity to make an appearance. Harris made her fifth appearance for the national team in the match against France on February 8. The United States lost the match 2–0. She also played all 90 minutes in the match against England on February 13, recording a shut out in the 1–0 win and earning her sixth cap.

On February 21, Harris was named to a 25-player roster for the 2015 Algarve Cup in Portugal. She was then named to a 25-player roster on March 20 for a match against New Zealand on April 4 in St. Louis. She was subsequently named as one of the 18 players that would suit up for the match, although she did not make an appearance.

On April 14, 2015, Harris was named to the 23-player roster that would represent the United States at the 2015 FIFA Women's World Cup. She was one of eight members of the team that were making their first World Cup roster. Harris became a World Cup Champion on July 5, when the United States defeated Japan 5–2 in the Women's World Cup final. Harris joined the national team on a Victory Tour following their World Cup win that started in Pittsburgh, Pennsylvania on August 16 and ended in New Orleans, Louisiana on December 16. Harris made a start during the first match of the Victory Tour against Costa Rica in an 8–0 win. She also made an appearance in the match against Haiti on September 17, coming in for Solo in the second half. The United States won the mach 5–0.

Harris was named to the 26-player roster for the national team's first training camp in 2016. The camp led into a match against Ireland on January 23. Harris suited up for the match but did not make an appearance. Harris was subsequently named to the 20-player roster for 2016 CONCACAF Women's Olympic Qualifying. The United States qualified to the 2016 Olympic Games in Rio de Janeiro after a semifinal win against Trinidad & Tobago on February 19. The United States went on to win the tournament after defeating Canada 2–0.

Harris was named to the roster for the 2016 SheBelieves Cup that took place from March 3 to 9. She then joined a 23-player roster for a training camp ahead of two matches against Colombia in early April. She did not dress for either match. Harris was on the roster for another two-game series against Japan, although she did not suit up for the games.

On July 12, 2016, Harris was named an alternate for the 2016 Olympic Games. Following Hope Solo's suspension after the 2016 Olympics, Harris along with Alyssa Naeher were competing for the U.S. WNT number one keeper spot. Naeher and Harris split the remaining games of 2016 equally.

In 2017 Harris started one game at the 2017 SheBelieves Cup and the Naeher started two. As 2017 progressed, Naeher emerged as the number one keeper for the U.S., and got most of the starts in goal. Due to a quad injury sustained in May, Harris only appeared in 3 games for the U.S in 2017.

In 2018 Harris remained as the back-up keeper to Alyssa Naeher. She was named to the final 20 player roster for the 2018 CONCACAF Women's Championship.

On May 1, 2019, Harris was named to the 23 player roster for the 2019 Women's World Cup. in 2020, Harris was named to the CONCACAF Women's Olympic Qualifying for Tokyo 2020. The team qualified for the Tokyo Olympics 2020 (postponed to summer 2021) in 1st place after beating Canada 3–0 in the final.
Harris was also named for the SheBelieves Cup 2020, 23-player Roster.

In popular culture

Video games
Harris was featured along with her national teammates in the EA Sports' FIFA video game series in FIFA 16, the first time women players were included in the game.

Honors
Following the United States' win at the 2015 FIFA Women's World Cup, Harris and her teammates became the first women's sports team to be honored with a Ticker Tape Parade in New York City. Each player received a key to the city from Mayor Bill de Blasio. In October of the same year, the team was honored by President Barack Obama at the White House.

Personal life
Off the field, Harris is known for her distinct sense of style and extensive tattoos and has professed to interests in fashion, music, surfing, and skateboarding. In August 2017, it was announced that she had signed a multi-year endorsement deal with Umbro as its first female brand ambassador. In its announcement of the endorsement, the brand noted that the deal would "usher in a new era for the modern consumer focused on on-field and off-field apparel" and that Harris had been involved in styling her first marketing shoot with the brand. Harris had previously been sponsored by Nike.

Harris has publicly shared her experiences with depression, aggression, and Adderall addiction as a youth and young adult, and is heavily involved with the mental health-focused non-profit To Write Love on Her Arms. In May 2016, Harris spoke out in support of Aniya Wolf, a teenager from Pennsylvania who had been barred from her Catholic high school's prom after planning to wear a suit. A Central Florida native, Harris has on a number of occasions expressed support for the victims, families, and communities affected by the June 2016 massacre at the Pulse bar in Orlando. Like many of her U.S. women's national team teammates, Harris has spoken of the sexism faced by female athletes and the importance of improving their pay and conditions.

In December 2016, Harris and national team coach Jill Ellis travelled to Liberia as part of the U.S. State Department's Sports Envoy program. In addition to participating in meetings with government officials in support of women's sports, Harris and Ellis worked closely with students at the Monrovia Football Academy. While Harris does not have formal coaching experience, she has led goalkeeper training sessions in conjunction with Orlando Pride teammate Ali Krieger's youth camps.

Harris has been in a relationship with Ali Krieger since 2010. In March 2019 they announced their engagement via People Magazine. Harris and Krieger married on December 28, 2019, in Miami. Megan Rapinoe, who played a role in the couple's coming out, served as Harris's maid of honor. On February 14, 2021, the couple announced the adoption of their daughter, Sloane Phillips Krieger-Harris, born two days earlier. On August 16, 2022 they announced the adoption of their son, Ocean Maeve Krieger-Harris.

Career statistics

Honors and awards
North Carolina Tar Heels
 NCAA Women's Soccer Championship: 2006, 2008, 2009
Western New York Flash
 Women's Professional Soccer Championship: 2011
United States U20
 CONCACAF Women's U-19 Qualifying Tournament: 2002
 FIFA U-19 Women's World Championship: 2002
United States

 FIFA Women's World Cup: 2015, 2019
 CONCACAF Women's Championship: 2014, 2018
 CONCACAF Women's Olympic Qualifying Tournament: 2016; 2020
 Algarve Cup: 2011, 2013, 2015
 SheBelieves Cup: 2016, 2018, 2020
 Tournament of Nations: 2018
Individual
 National Soccer Coaches Association of America Player of the Year: 2004
 NSCAA All-American: 2001–2004
 Parade Magazine All-American: 2001–2004
 Parade Magazine Player of the Year: 2004
 Gatorade Player of the Year: 2004
 NWSL Goalkeeper of the Year: 2016
NWSL Best XI: 2016
WPS Goalkeeper of the Year: 2011
WPS Best XI: 2011

References

External links

 
 
 US Soccer player profile
 North Carolina player profile
 Washington Spirit player profile
 11 Questions with Ashlyn Harris
 
 

1985 births
Living people
Washington Freedom players
USL W-League (1995–2015) players
National Women's Soccer League players
2015 FIFA Women's World Cup players
People from Satellite Beach, Florida
Soccer players from Florida
FIFA Women's World Cup-winning players
Women's association football goalkeepers
Orlando Pride players
American women's soccer players
United States women's international soccer players
North Carolina Tar Heels women's soccer players
Tyresö FF players
Satellite High School alumni
American LGBT sportspeople
LGBT people from Florida
LGBT association football players
2019 FIFA Women's World Cup players
Washington Spirit players
FCR 2001 Duisburg players
Pali Blues players
Saint Louis Athletica players
Western New York Flash players
Parade High School All-Americans (girls' soccer)
Damallsvenskan players
People from Cocoa Beach, Florida
American expatriate soccer players in Germany
Expatriate women's footballers in Sweden
American expatriate sportspeople in Sweden
Lesbian sportswomen
American expatriate women's soccer players
21st-century LGBT people
Women's Professional Soccer players
NJ/NY Gotham FC players